Checkpoint Strikeforce is a multi-jurisdictional program in Virginia, Washington DC, Delaware, West Virginia, and Maryland to combat drunk driving. Its motto is "Drunk driving, over the limit, under arrest." Checkpoint Strikeforce began in Virginia in 2002. In 2007, 800,000 drivers were stopped at Checkpoint Strikeforce sobriety checkpoints.

Campaigns
In 2013, jurisdictions took part in the "Thanksgiving Belts & Booze Campaign" to draw attention to the high rate of DUI crashes that occur over the holidays. The campaign lasted from November 25 to December 13, 2013.

External links
WRAP, Washington Regional Alcohol Program, Checkpoint Strikeforce

References

Driving under the influence